Umingmalik formerly Gateshead Island is an island located in the Kitikmeot Region of Nunavut, Canada. It is an important polar bear denning area.

This is a different island than the one visited by Richard Collinson, commanding HMS Enterprise, while searching for John Franklin.

References 

Uninhabited islands of Kitikmeot Region